Rosalind Clair Gill (born 1963) is a British sociologist and feminist cultural theorist. She is currently Professor of Social and Cultural Analysis at City, University of London. Gill is author or editor of ten books, and numerous articles and chapters, and her work has been translated into Chinese, German, Portuguese, Spanish and Turkish.

Biography 
Gill was born on 22 April 1963, the daughter of Janet and Michael Gill, whom she describes as left-wing and politically engaged parents. In an interview she says she grew up to be "a young, politically active, left-wing person" with a particular interest in "how culture, and ideology gets inside us and shapes us."

She received her doctorate, which was concerned with new racism and new sexism in British pop radio, in social psychology from the Discourse and Rhetoric Group (DARG), Loughborough University in 1991. In an interview, she has identified Michael Billig (her PhD supervisor) and Stuart Hall as major influences  and, together with Christina Scharff, she dedicated the book New Femininities: Postfeminism, Neoliberalism and Subjectivity to Angela McRobbie. Gill’s work is interdisciplinary, and she has worked in departments of Psychology, Sociology, Media and Communications, and Gender Studies. Based mainly in London, she has held posts at Goldsmiths College, King’s College and the LSE, where she was the first tenured member of staff in the Gender Institute (1997-2007). She took up her position at City, University of London, in 2013.

Research 
Gill is known for her research interests in gender and sexuality, media and new technologies, the cultural and creative industries, and work and labour. Substantively her work has made major contributions to debates about postfeminism and neoliberalism; the persistence and dynamics of inequality; constructions of sex, sexuality and intimacy; and changing experiences of work in creative and academic fields.  Her work is shaped by her interdisciplinary background, located between sociology, psychology, media and communications, and gender and sexuality studies.  It is animated by psychosocial questions about power, inequality and the relationship between culture and subjectivity. She also has a long-standing interest in methodology and the research process, and has authored books and articles about discourse analysis, reflexivity, and secrets and silences in research.

Postfeminism 

One of Gill's most significant theoretical contributions is her discussion of postfeminism, which she claims is "one of the most important and contested terms in the lexicon of feminist cultural analysis". She argues that though the term has been used by scholars for decades there is still "no agreement among scholars about what postfeminism means. The term is used variously and contradictorily to signal a theoretical position, a type of feminism after the Second Wave, or a regressive political stance".

In a highly cited article in European Journal of Cultural Studies (ECJS) in 2007, Gill argued that postfeminism should be thought of as a contemporary “sensibility”, shaped by neoliberalism and “by stark and continuing inequalities” related to gender race and class. Elements of this sensibility include:

 An obsessive preoccupation with the body
 The shift from women being portrayed as submissive, passive objects, to being portrayed as active, desiring sexual subjects
 The preeminence of notions of choice, 'being oneself' and 'pleasing oneself'
 A focus on self-surveillance and discipline
 A makeover paradigm
 The reassertion of sexual difference
 Media messages that are characterised by irony and knowingness

This framing of postfeminism has been very influential, with well over 1000 academic citations. In 2017, in the 20th anniversary issue of EJCS, Gill was asked to reflect on the piece and developed her argument in three important directions: emphasising the significance of intersectional analyses of postfeminist culture; highlighting the “psychic life” of postfeminism; and setting out directions for considering the affective dimensions of postfeminism, organised around confidence, resilience, positive thinking and  “inspiration”. In another significant intervention in the journal Feminist Media Studies in 2016 Gill explored the status of postfeminism in a moment characterised by both a resurgence of feminist activism and a heightened popular misogyny, and defended the continued relevance of the term to signify an object of critique.

New sexism and the dynamics of discrimination 
Gill’s work has also made a contribution to debates about how discrimination changes. In her Ph.D. research on British broadcasting, she built on analyses of new racism, and documented new forms of sexism. The term was coined to speak to the way that patterns of discrimination were taking new forms in a cultural context marked by more egalitarian values. In later work she looked at other media environments that explicitly marked themselves as ‘cool, creative and egalitarian’ showing the novel forms that sexism took in such sites. In a 2014 article in Social Politics she developed the notion that in seemingly egalitarian workplaces inequality becomes “unspeakable” and perhaps even unintelligible. This work challenges debates centred on maternity as the primary reason for women’s underrepresentation in cultural and creative fields, and pointed to the need to explore the flexibility and dynamism of sexism as a set of practices.

Sex, "sexualisation" and intimacy 

Gill has been a major contributor to debates about the alleged "sexualisation of culture", with a perspective she describes as “sex positive but anti-sexism”. She was one of the organisers of a significant ESRC seminar series titled Pornified? Complicating the debates about the sexualisation of culture. This brought together artists, academics, policymakers and activists on different sides of the “sexualisation wars” divide. Gill consistently argued for the need to dialogue across differences and to think critically about the cultural processes gathered under the heading “sexualisation” with greater attention to specificities of power and identity. In an article in Sexualities she called for intersectional complications, arguing there is no “one size fits all” kind of sexualisation that does not vary by gender, sexuality, race, class, age etc. Gill’s research has included a large-scale qualitative study of men’s experiences of a visual culture increasingly dominated by idealised representations of the male body. She has also looked critically at the commercial “Love Your Body” trend and the packaging of “sexy” images through tropes of empowerment.

In 2012, Rosalind Gill worked with Jessica Ringrose, Sonia Livingstone and Laura Harvey on and NSPCC-funded research project about “sexting”, focused on listening to young people’s experiences of mobile communications and image sharing. The research was published as a report,  several articles,  and was also used as the basis of a play titled Sket, written by Maya Sondhi, which premiered at London’s Park Theatre in 2016, directed by Prav MJ.

The representation of sex and sexuality remain key interests and Gill’s 2018 monograph, Mediated Intimacy, co-written with Meg-John Barker and Laura Harvey, argues that media are our biggest source of information about sex and relationships, and charts the representation of what is depicted as “normal”, and constructions of consent, desire, pleasure and work.

Work and labour 
The experience of work in neoliberal societies represents another key focus for Gill. She has conducted extensive empirical research in “creative” occupations including broadcasting, advertising and web design. Her work has made important contributions to theorising both precariousness and inequality in these settings. Her co-edited collections Theorising Cultural Work (with Mark Banks and Stephanie Taylor) and Gender and Creative Labour (with Bridget Conor and Stephanie Taylor) pull together these arguments. Gill is also co-editor, with Ursula Huws, of Palgrave’s Dynamics of Virtual Work series, which came out of an EU COST grant of the same name. In 2008 Gill co-edited a special issue of Theory, Culture & Society about work in the cultural and creative industries, and was author of an influential article about immaterial labour and precarity.

Academic work is a further interest, exemplified by Gill’s much circulated essay "The Hidden Injuries of the Neoliberal University", and several subsequent articles. Gill’s contribution has been to move beyond programmatic accounts of the “corporate university” or “new public management” and to explore the lived experience of working cultures marked by increasing precariousness, time pressure, and audit.

Engagement and influence 

Gill has received funding from and worked on projects commissioned by the Arts Council, the Arts and Humanities Research Council (AHRC), The British Academy (BA), The Economic and Social Research Council (ESRC), the European Commission and the United Nations (both UNESCO and the UNCSW).

Gill has also worked with a range of governmental, non-governmental and activist bodies. She serves on several editorial boards including Feminist Media Studies; Theory, Culture & Society; Communication, Culture and Critique; Feminism & Psychology; Psychology and Sexuality; Australian Feminist Studies; and International Journal of Media and Cultural Politics. Besides the contribution of her own research, Gill’s influence has also been felt through her teaching and extensive PhD supervision. Many former PhD students have gone on to have successful academic careers, including Dr Feyza Akinerdem, Dr Sara de Benedictis, Dr Simidele Dosekun, Dr Laura Favaro, Dr Roisin Ryan Flood, Dr Laura Harvey, Dr Tracey Jensen, Professor Elisabeth Kelan, Dr Jongmi Kim, Dr Rachel O’Neill, Dr Christina Scharff, and Dr Karen Throsby.

Work in progress 
Gill is currently writing a book for Duke University press that develops her work with Shani Orgad on “The Confidence Cult”. She is also working on a critical collection for Palgrave interrogating “creative hubs”. This partly emerges from the AHRC award Creativeworks London. Finally, she is completing a monograph about postfeminism/gendered neoliberalism for Polity Press.

Additionally, she is developing research projects about academia, dating apps, and machine vision of the body. In an interview in Open Democracy she explains that the latter develops from work about beauty apps and surveillance.

Selected publications

Journal articles
 
 
 
 
 
 
 
 
 
 
 
 
  Pdf.

Books
 
 
 
 
 
 
 
 
 Gill, Rosalind; Orgad, Shani (2021). Confidence Culture. Durham, UK: Duke University Press. ISBN 9781478017608

Chapters in books
 
  pdf version Gender Institute, London School of Economics.

See also

University College London
Feminist philosophy 
Feminist theory 
Gender studies

References 

1963 births
Academics of Goldsmiths, University of London
Academics of King's College London
Academics of the London School of Economics
Academics of the Open University
Alumni of Loughborough University
British feminists
British sociologists
Living people
Social psychologists
British women sociologists